Alan Stuart Kaplinsky (born December 1, 1945) is an American lawyer. He heads the consumer financial services practice at Ballard Spahr. Kaplinsky "pioneered the use of pre-dispute arbitration provisions in consumer contracts" and has written and lectured extensively on the subject. He was instrumental in launching his firm’s blog and podcast series, Consumer Finance Monitor, devoted to the activities of the CFPB as well as federal and state agencies and attorneys general and other significant consumer financial services developments. The blog was named one of the 100 best law blogs in the nation by the American Bar Association for 2012-2016. He has been named as a tier one banking and consumer financial services lawyer in the 2006-2020 editions of Chambers USA: America’s Leading Lawyers for Business, a directory of America’s leading lawyers. Chambers refers to him as "its leading light for CFPB compliance matters" and calls him "a guru of consumer financial services on both the regulatory and litigation sides [who has] earned his well-deserved national reputation when successfully defending the very first class actions brought against financial institutions." He has also been named in The Best Lawyers in America under financial services regulation law and banking and finance litigation from 2007-2019.

Career
After graduating from the University of Pennsylvania in 1967 and Boston College Law School in 1970, Kaplinsky clerked for Judge John Biggs, Jr. on the United States Court of Appeals for the Third Circuit before joining the Philadelphia law firm of Wolf, Block, Schorr and Solis-Cohen. From 1976 to 1979, he served as General Counsel of the Teachers Service Organization, Inc.

In 1995, Kaplinsky joined Ballard Spahr LLP along with several colleagues from Wolf, Block, Schorr and Solis-Cohen to found a consumer financial services practice at Ballard Spahr. Kaplinsky is best known for pioneering the use of arbitration provisions in the consumer finance area, including credit cards and auto loans. He is the first lawyer in the country to include class action waiver language in consumer arbitration clauses that require consumers to individually arbitrate any dispute.

Academia, law reform work, and board memberships
Kaplinsky was the first president of the American College of Consumer Financial Services Lawyers (1996–1998) and in April 2016, he received the American College’s Lifetime Achievement Award. The award is granted periodically to a person whose career has produced significant contributions to the field of consumer financial services law. He is past chair of the Committee on Consumer Financial Services of the Section of Business Law of the American Bar Association. He has chaired the Practising Law Institute’s Annual Institute on Consumer Financial Services since its inception in 1995.  Kaplinsky was elected to the American Law Institute in 2006 and in 2012 was named an Adviser on the Restatement Third, The Law of Consumer Contracts.

Kaplinsky was named to the National Law Journal’s 2015 list of Litigation Trailblazers for pioneering work in the area of consumer arbitration and the use of class action waivers.

He was featured in the November 1, 2015 New York Times lead front page article about pioneering class action waivers in consumer arbitration provisions.

In April 2019, Mr. Kaplinsky testified before the Senate Judiciary Committee on “Arbitration in America.”

Kaplinsky was selected for his work on the Consumer Finance Monitor blog for the National Law Review’s 2018 Go-To Thought Leadership Award to honor excellence in legal news and analysis.

Personal life
He and his wife Ellen have three children.

References

Boston College Law School alumni
Wharton School of the University of Pennsylvania alumni
20th-century American lawyers
21st-century American lawyers
Pennsylvania lawyers
People from Holyoke, Massachusetts
20th-century American educators
21st-century American educators
Living people
1945 births